Lee Ramoon (born 29 January 1965) is a former international footballer from the Cayman Islands.

Career

Club career
Ramoon played college soccer in the United States at King College. In 1988, Ramoon went to England and signed with Stockport County, making a number of appearances for their reserve team, and scoring a goal against Everton's Reserves on 9 September 1988. He had a second spell in the UK in 1994–95, making two substitute appearances (scoring once) in the English Football Conference. Ramoon spent spells at Winsford United (November 1994), Burscough and Welsh club Porthmadog (February 1995), all on loan from Altrincham. Ramoon later returned to Cayman to play with George Town, winning three League titles and four Cups in five years.

International career
Ramoon made his first appearance for the Cayman Islands national team in 1979, at the age of 14, and made over 200 official and unofficial international appearances. Ramoon also captained the national team on numerous occasions.

International goals

Scores and results list the Cayman Islands' goal tally first.

Honours
Ramoon was awarded the FIFA Order of Merit for the year 2004.

References

1965 births
Living people
Caymanian footballers
Cayman Islands international footballers
Altrincham F.C. players
Burscough F.C. players
Stockport County F.C. players
Porthmadog F.C. players
George Town SC players
Caymanian football managers

Association footballers not categorized by position